The Uruk period (ca. 4000 to 3100 BC; also known as Protoliterate period) existed from the protohistoric Chalcolithic to Early Bronze Age  period in the history of Mesopotamia, after the Ubaid period and before the Jemdet Nasr period. Named after the Sumerian city of Uruk, this period saw the emergence of urban life in Mesopotamia and the Sumerian civilization. The late Uruk period (34th to 32nd centuries) saw the gradual emergence of the cuneiform script and corresponds to the Early Bronze Age; it has also been described as the "Protoliterate period".

It was during this period that pottery painting declined as copper started to become popular, along with cylinder seals.

Dating and periodization

The term Uruk period was coined at a conference in Baghdad in 1930, along with the preceding Ubaid period and following Jemdet Nasr period. The chronology of the Uruk period is highly debated and still very uncertain. It is known that it covered most of the 4th millennium BC. But there is no agreement on the date when it began or ended and the major breaks within the period are difficult to determine. This is due primarily to the fact that the original stratigraphy of the central quarter of Uruk is ancient and very unclear and the excavations of it were conducted in the 1930s, before many modern dating techniques existed. These problems are largely linked to the difficulty specialists have had establishing synchronisms between the different archaeological sites and a relative chronology, which would enable the development of a more reliable absolute chronology.

The traditional chronology is very imprecise and is based on some key sondages in the Eanna quarter at Uruk. The most ancient levels of these sondages (XIX–XIII) belong to the end of the Ubaid period (Ubaid V, 4200–3900 or 3700 BC); pottery characteristic of the Uruk period begins to appear in levels XIV/XIII.

The Uruk period is traditionally divided into many phases. The first two are "Old Uruk" (levels XII–IX), then "Middle Uruk" (VIII–VI). These first two phases are poorly known, and their chronological limits are poorly defined; many different chronological systems are found in scholarship.

From the middle of the 4th millennium, it transitions to the best-known period, "Late Uruk", which continues until around 3200 or 3100 BC. It is in fact in this period that the features which are generally seen as most characteristic of the civilization of the Uruk period occur: high technological development, the development of important urban agglomerations with imposing monumental structures (the most characteristic of these is Level IV of Eanna), the appearance of state institutions, and the expansion of the Uruk civilization throughout the whole Near East.

Jemdet Nasr period
This phase of "Late Uruk" is followed by another phase (level III of Eanna) in which the Uruk civilization declined and a number of distinct local cultures developed throughout the Near East.  This is generally known as the Jemdet Nasr period, after the archaeological site of that name. Its exact nature is highly debated, and it is difficult to clearly distinguish its traits from those of the Uruk culture, so some scholars refer to it as the "Final Uruk" period instead. It lasted from around 3000 to 2900 BC.

Alternative chronology
In 2001, a new chronology was proposed by the members of a colloquium at Santa Fe, based on recent excavations, especially at sites outside Mesopotamia. They consider the Uruk period to be the "Late Chalcolithic" (LC). Their LC 1 corresponds to the end of the Ubaid period and ends around 4200 BC, with the beginning of LC 2, which is the first phase of the Uruk period. They divide "Old Uruk" into two phases, with the dividing line placed around 4000 BC. Around 3800 BC, LC 3 begins, which corresponds to the "Middle Uruk" phase and continues until around 3400 BC, when it is succeeded by LC 4. It rapidly transitions to LC 5 (Late Uruk), which continues until 3000 BC.

Some other chronological proposals have also been put forward, such as by the ARCANE team (Associated Regional Chronologies for the Ancient Near East).

Although the chronology of the Uruk period is full of uncertainties, it is generally agreed to have a rough span of a thousand years covering the period from 4000 to 3000 BC and to be divided into several phases: an initial urbanisation and elaboration of Urukian cultural traits marks the transition from the end of the Ubaid period (Old Uruk), then a period of expansion (Middle Uruk), with a peak during which the characteristic traits of the 'Uruk civilization' are definitively established (Late Uruk), and then a retreat of Urukian influence and increase in cultural diversity in the Near East along with a decline of the 'centre'.

Some researchers have attempted to explain this final stage as the arrival of new populations of Semitic origin (the future Akkadians), but there is no conclusive proof of this. In Lower Mesopotamia, the researchers identify this as the Jemdet Nasr period, which sees a shift to more concentrated habitation, undoubtedly accompanied by a reorganisation of power; in southwestern Iran, it is the Proto-Elamite period; Niniveh V in Upper Mesopotamia (which follows the Gawra culture); the "Scarlet Ware" culture in Diyala. In Lower Mesopotamia, the Early Dynastic Period begins around the start of the 3rd millennium BC, during which this region again exerts considerable influence over its neighbours.

Lower Mesopotamia 

Lower Mesopotamia is the core of the Uruk period culture and the region seems to have been the cultural centre of the time because this is where the principal monuments are found and the most obvious traces of an urban society with state institutions developing in the second half of the 4th millennium BC, the first system of writing, and it is the material and symbolic culture of this region which had the most influence on the rest of the Near East at this time. However, this region is not well-known archaeologically, since only the site of Uruk itself has provided traces of monumental architecture and administrative documents which justify seeing this region as the most dynamic and influential. At some other sites, construction from this period has been found, but they are usually known only as a result of soundages. In the current state of knowledge it remains impossible to determine whether the site of Uruk was actually unique in this region or if it is simply an accident of excavation that makes it seem more important than the others.

This is the region of the Near East that was the most agriculturally productive, as a result of an irrigation system which developed in the 4th millennium BC and focused on the cultivation of barley (along with the date palm and various other fruits and legumes) and the pasturing of sheep for their wool. Although it lacked mineral resources and was located in an arid area, it had undeniable geographic and environmental advantages: it consisted of a vast delta, a flat region transected by waterways, resulting in a potentially vast area of cultivatable land, over which communications by river or land were easy. It may also have become a highly populated and urbanised region in the 4th millennium BC, with a social hierarchy, artisanal activities, and long-distance commerce. It has been the focus of archaeological investigation led by Robert McCormick Adams Jr., whose work has been very important for the understanding of the emergence of urban societies in this region. A clear settlement hierarchy has been identified, dominated by a number of agglomerations which grew more and more important over the 4th millennium BC, of which Uruk seems to have been the most important by far, making this the most ancient known case of urban macrocephaly, since its hinterland seems to have reinforced Uruk itself to the detriment of its neighbours (notably the region to the north, around Adab and Nippur) in the final part of the period.

The ethnic composition of this region in the Uruk period cannot be determined with certainty. It is connected to the problem of the origins of the Sumerians and the dating of their emergence (if they are considered locals of the region) or their arrival (if they are thought to have migrated) in lower Mesopotamia. There is no agreement on the archaeological evidence for a migration, or on whether the earliest form of writing already reflects a specific language. Some argue that it is actually Sumerian, in which case the Sumerians would have been its inventors and would have already been present in the region in the final centuries of the 4th millennium at the latest (which seems to be the most widely accepted position). Whether other ethnic groups were also present, especially Semitic ancestors of the Akkadians or one or several 'pre-Sumerian' peoples (neither Sumerian nor Semite and predating both in the region) is also debated and cannot be resolved by excavation.

Uruk 

Out of these urban agglomerations, it is Uruk, the period's eponymous site, which was the largest by far, according to our current knowledge, and it is the main one from which the chronological sequence of the period has been constructed. It may have covered 230–500 hectares at its peak during the Late Uruk period, more than the other contemporary large settlements, and it may have had a population of between 25,000 and 50,000 people. The architectural profile of the site consists of two monumental groups located 500 metres apart.

The most remarkable constructions are located in the sector called the Eanna (after the temple which was located there in subsequent periods and possibly already at this stage). After the 'Limestone Temple' of level V, a programme of construction hitherto unparalleled was begun in level IV. Thereafter, the buildings were vastly larger than earlier, some had novel designs and new construction techniques were used for the structure and the decoration. Level IV of the Eanna is divided into two monumental groups: in the west, a complex centred on the 'Temple with mosaics' (decorated with mosaics made of painted clay cones) of level IVB, subsequently covered by another building (the 'Riemchen Building') of level IVA. To the east there is a very important group of structures—notably a 'Square Building' and the 'Riemchen Temple Building', which were subsequently replaced by other buildings with original plans, like the 'Hall with Pillars' and the 'Hall with Mosaics', a square 'Grand Court' and two very large buildings with a tripartite plan, 'Temple C' (54 x 22 m) and 'Temple D' (80 x 50 m, the largest building known from the Uruk period).

The second monumental sector was attributed to the god Anu by the excavators of the site, because it was the location of a sanctuary for this god some 3000 years later. It is dominated by a series of temples built on a high terrace after the Ubayd period. The best-preserved of these is the "White Temple" of level IV, which measures 17.5 x 22.3 m and gets its name from white plates that covered its walls. At its base, a building with a labyrinthine plan, called the 'Stone building', was built.

The function of these buildings, which are unparalleled in their size and the fact that they are gathered in monumental groups, is debated. The excavators of the site wanted to see them as 'temples', influenced by the fact that in the historic period, the Eanna was the area dedicated to the goddess Inanna and the other sector was dedicated to the god An. This conformed to the theory of the 'temple-city' which was in vogue during the inter-war period. It is possible that this is actually a place of power formed by a complex of buildings of different forms (palatial residences, administrative spaces, palace chapels), desired by the dominant power in the city, whose nature is still unclear. In any case, it was necessary to invest considerable effort to construct these buildings, which shows the capacities of the elites of this period. Uruk is also the site of the most important discoveries of early writing tablets, in levels IV and III, in a context where they had been disposed of, which means that the context in which they were created is not known to us. Uruk III, which corresponds to the Jemdet Nasr period, sees a complete reorganisation of the Eanna quarter, in which the buildings on the site were razed and replaced by a grand terrace, which ignores the earlier buildings. In their foundations, a deposit which is probably of a cultic nature (the Sammelfund) was found, containing some major artistic works of the period (large cultic vase, cylinder seals, etc.).

Other sites in Lower Mesopotamia 

Outside Uruk, few sites in southern Mesopotamia have yielded levels contemporary with the Uruk period. Soundages carried out on the sites of most of the key cities of Mesopotamia in the historic period have revealed that they were occupied in this period (Kish, Girsu, Nippur, Ur, perhaps Shuruppak and Larsa, and further north in Diyala, Tell Asmar and Khafajah). The sacred quarter of Eridu, site of the main monumental structures of the Ubaid period in Lower Mesopotamia, is poorly known for the Uruk period though Uruk Period pottery was found there. The only important structure from the end of the 4th millennium BC so far known from the region outside Uruk is the 'Painted Temple' on the platform of Tell Uqair, which dates to the end of the Uruk period or perhaps the Jemdet Nasr period, and consists of two terraces superimposed on one another with a building of around 18 x 22 m identified as having a cultic function. More recently, a level belonging to the Uruk period has been revealed on the tell southeast of the site of Abu Salabikh ('Uruk Mound'), covering only 10 hectares. This site was surrounded by a wall which has been only partially revealed and several buildings have been brought to light, including a platform which supported a building, only traces of which remain. As for the site of Jemdet Nasr, which has given its name to the period of transition from the Uruk period to the Early Dynastic period, it is divided into two main tells and it is on the second (Mound B) that the most important building has been brought to light, which contained a substantial cache of administrative documents—more than 200 tablets with impressions of cylinder seals.

Neighbouring regions 
The sources relating to the Uruk period derive from a group of sites distributed over an immense area, covering all of Mesopotamia and the neighbouring regions up to central Iran and southeastern Anatolia. The Uruk culture itself is certainly characterised mainly by sites of southern Mesopotamia and others which seem to have directly resulted from migrations from this region (the 'colonies' or 'emporia'), which are clearly part of the Uruk culture. But the phenomenon which is known as the Uruk expansion is detected on sites situated across a vast zone of influence, covering the whole Near East, regions which were not all really part of the Uruk culture, which was strictly-speaking limited to Lower Mesopotamia. The relations of some areas with the Uruk culture are very unclear, such as the little-known cultures of the Persian Gulf in this period, and Egypt whose exact relations with the Uruk culture were distant and are the object of debate, as well as the Levant, where the influence of southern Mesopotamia remains barely perceptible. But in other areas the Uruk culture is more evident, such as Upper Mesopotamia, northern Syria, western Iran and southeastern Anatolia. They generally experienced an evolution similar to that of lower Mesopotamia, with the development of urban agglomerations and larger political entities and they were strongly influenced by the culture of the 'centre' in the later part of the period (c. 3400–3200), before a general strengthening of their own regional cultures took place at the turn of the 3rd millennium BC. The interpretation of the expansion of the Uruk culture into neighbouring regions poses numerous problems and many explanatory models (general and regional) have been proposed in order to explain it.

Susiana and the Iranian Plateau 

The region around Susa in the southwest of modern Iran, is located right next to lower Mesopotamia, which exercised a powerful influence on it from the 5th millennium BC, and might be considered to have been part of the Uruk culture in the second half of the 4th millennium BC, either as a result of conquest or a more gradual acculturation, but it did retain its own unique characteristics. The Uruk period levels at Susa are called Susa I (c. 4000–3700 BC) and Susa II (c. 3700–3100 BC), during which the site became an urban settlement. Susa I saw the beginning of monumental architecture on the site, with the construction of a 'High Terrace', which was increased during Susa II to measure roughly 60 x 45 metres. The most interesting aspect of this site is the objects discovered there, which are the most important evidence available to us for the art of the Uruk period and the beginning of administration and writing. The cylinder seals of Susa I and Susa II have a very rich iconography, uniquely emphasising scenes of everyday life, although there is also some kind of local potentate which P. Amiet sees as a 'proto-royal figure,' preceding the 'priest-kings' of Late Uruk. These cylinder seals, as well as bullae and clay tokens, indicate the rise of administration and of accounting techniques at Susa during the second half of the 4th millennium BC. Susa has also yielded some of the most ancient writing tablets, making it a key site for our understanding of the origins of writing. Other sites in Susiana also have archaeological levels belonging to this period, like Jaffarabad and Chogha Mish.

Further north, in the Zagros, the site of Godin Tepe in the Kangavar valley is particularly important. Level V of this site belongs to the Uruk period. Remains have been uncovered of an ovoid wall, enclosing several buildings organised around a central court, with a large structure to the north which might be a public building. The material culture has some traits which are shared with that of Late Uruk and Susa II. Level V of Godin Tepe could be interpreted as an establishment of merchants from Susa and/or lower Mesopotamia, interested in the location of the site on commercial routes, especially those linked to the tin and lapis lazuli mines on the Iranian Plateau and in Afghanistan. Further east, the key site of Tepe Sialk, near Kashan, shows no clear evidence of links with the Uruk culture in its Level III, but beveled rim bowls are found all the way out to Tepe Ghabristan in the Elbourz and at some sites in Kerman further to the southeast.

In this region, the retreat of the Uruk culture resulted in a particular phenomenon, the Proto-Elamite civilization, which seems to have been centred on the region of Tell-e Malyan and Susiana and seems to have taken over the Uruk culture's links with the Iranian plateau.

Upper Mesopotamia and northern Syria 
Several important sites of the Uruk period have been excavated in the Middle Euphrates region, during the salvage campaigns preceding the construction of hydroelectric dams in the area. It is largely as a result of the findings of these excavations that ideas of an "Uruk expansion" have arisen.

The best known site is Habuba Kabira, a fortified port on the right bank of the river in Syria. The city covered around 22 hectares, surrounded by a defensive wall, roughly 10 percent of which has been uncovered. Study of the buildings on this site shows that it was a planned settlement, which would have required significant means. The archaeological material from the site is identical to that of Uruk, consisting of pottery, cylinder-seals, bullae, accounting calculi, and numerical tablets from the end of the period. Thus this new city has every appearance of being an Urukian colony. Around 20 residences of various sorts have been excavated. They have a tripartite plan, arranged around a reception hall with a foyer opening onto an internal courtyard, with additional rooms arranged around it. In the south of the site is a hill, Tell Qanas, which has a monumental group of several structures identified speculatively as 'temples' on an artificial terrace. The site was abandoned at the end of the 4th millennium BC, apparently without violence, during the period when the Uruk culture retreated.

As at Habuba Kabira, there is an urban centre made up of residences of various kinds and a central monumental complex of two 'temples'. It is beyond doubt that this city too was built by 'Urukians'. A little further north, is a third possibly Urukian colony, Sheikh Hassan, on the middle Euphrates. It is possible that these sites were part of a state implanted in the region by people from south Mesopotamia and were developed in order to take advantage of important commercial routes.

In the Khabur valley, Tell Brak was an important urban centre from the 5th millennium BC, one of the largest of the Uruk period, since it covered over 110 hectares at its height. Some residences from the period have been uncovered, along with pottery typical of Uruk, but what has received the most attention is a succession of monuments which are definitely for cultic purposes. The 'Eye Temple' (as its final stage is known) has walls decorated with terracotta cones which form a mosaic and with inlays of coloured stones and a platform which might have been an altar and is decorated with gold leaf, lapis lazuli, silver nails, and white marble in a central T-shaped room. The most remarkable find are over two hundred "eye figurines" which give the building its name. These figurines have enormous eyes and are definitely votive deposits. Tell Brak has also produced evidence of writing: a numeric tablet and two pictographic tablets showing some unique features in comparison to those of southern Mesopotamia, which indicates that there was a distinct local tradition of writing. A little to the east of Tell Brak is Hamoukar, where excavations began in 1999. This vast site has provided the normal evidence found at sites under Urukian influence in Upper Mesopotamia (pottery, seals) and evidence of the existence of an important urban centre in this region in the Uruk period, like Tell Brak. Further to the east again, the site of Tell al-Hawa also shows evidence of contacts with lower Mesopotamia.

On the Tigris, the site of Nineveh (Tell Kuyunjik, level 4) was located on some major commercial routes and was also within the Urukian sphere of influence. The site covered roughly 40 hectares—the whole area of Tell Kuyunjik. The material remains of the period are very limited, but beveled rim bowls, an accounting bulla, and a numerical tablet characteristic of the Late Uruk period have been found. Nearby, Tepe Gawra, which was also important in the Ubayd period, is an important case of the changing scale of monumental architecture and of political entities between the end of the 5th millennium and the first half of the 4th millennium BC (Level XII to VIII). The excavations there have revealed some very rich tombs, different kinds of residence, workshops, and very large buildings with an official or religious function (notably the 'round structure'), which may indicate that Tepe Gawra was a regional political centre. However, it declined before the Uruk expansion into Upper Mesopotamia.

Southeast Anatolia 
Several sites have been excavated in the Euphrates valley in the south east of Anatolia, near the region of the Urukian sites of the middle Euphrates. Hacınebi, near modern Birecik in Şanlıurfa, was excavated by G. Stein and was located at the crossroads of some important commercial routes. Beveled rim bowls appear from phase B1 (c. 3800/3700 BC) and they are also present in phase B2 (3700–3300 BC), along with other objects characteristic of Late Uruk, like mosaics of clay cones, a terracotta sickle, an accounting bulla imprinted with the pattern from a cylinder seal, an uninscribed clay tablet, etc. This material co-exists with local pottery, which remains dominant throughout. The excavator of the site thinks that there was an enclave of people from Lower Mesopotamia who lived on the site alongside a majority population of local people.

Other sites have been excavated in the region of Samsat (also in the Euphrates valley). An Urukian site was revealed at Samsat during a hasty rescue excavation before the area was flooded as a result of the construction of a hydroelectric dam. Fragments of clay cones from a wall mosaic were found. A little to the south is Kurban Höyük, where clay cones and pottery characteristic of Uruk have also been found in tripartite buildings.

Further to the north, the site of Arslantepe, located in the suburbs of Malatya, is the most remarkable site of the period in eastern Anatolia. It has been excavated by M. Frangipane. During the first half of the 4th millennium BC, this site was dominated by a building called 'Temple C' by the excavators, which was built on a platform. It was abandoned around 3500 BC and replaced by a monumental complex which seems to have been the regional centre of power. The culture of Late Uruk had a discernible influence, which can be seen most clearly in the numerous sealings found on the site, many of which are in a south Mesopotamian style. Around 3000 BC, the site was destroyed by a fire. The monuments were not restored and the Kura–Araxes culture centred on the southern Caucasus became the dominant material culture on the site. Further west, the site of  has also revealed pottery influenced by that of Uruk. But in this region, the Urukian influence becomes increasingly ephemeral, as one gets further from Mesopotamia.

The 'Uruk expansion' 

After the discovery in Syria of the sites at Habuba Kabira and Jebel Aruda in the 1970s, which were rapidly decided to be colonies or trading posts of the Uruk civilisation settled far from their own lands, questions arose about the relationship between Lower Mesopotamia and the neighbouring regions. The fact that the characteristics of the culture of the Uruk region are found across such a large territory (from northern Syria to the Iranian plateau), with Lower Mesopotamia as a clear centre, led the archaeologists who studied this period to see this phenomenon as an "Uruk expansion". This has been reinforced by the political situation in the modern Near East and the impossibility of excavating in Mesopotamia. Recent excavations have focused on sites outside Mesopotamia, as a 'periphery', and with an interest in how they related to the 'centre', which is paradoxically the region in this period which is least well-known—limited to the impressionistic discoveries of the monuments of Uruk. Subsequently, theories and knowledge have developed to the point of general models, drawing on parallels from other places and periods, which has posed some problems in terms of getting the models and parallels to fit the facts revealed by excavations.

Guillermo Algaze adopted the World-systems theory of Immanuel Wallerstein and theories of international trade, elaborating the first model that sought to explain the Uruk civilization. In his view, which has met with some approval, but has also found many critics,  the 'Urukians' created a collection of colonies outside Lower Mesopotamia, first in Upper Mesopotamia (Habuba Kabira and Jebel Aruda, as well as Nineveh, Tell Brak and Samsat to the north), then in Susiana and the Iranian plateau. For Algaze, the motivation of this activity is considered to be a form of economic imperialism: the elites of southern Mesopotamia wanted to obtain the numerous raw materials which were not available in the Tigris and Euphrates floodplains, and founded their colonies on nodal points which controlled a vast commercial network (although it remains impossible to determine what exactly was exchanged), settling them with refugees as in some models of Greek colonisation. The relations established between Lower Mesopotamia and the neighbouring regions were thus of an asymmetric kind. The inhabitants of Lower Mesopotamia had the advantage in the interactions with neighbouring regions as a result of the high productivity of their lands, which had allowed their region to "take off" (he speaks of "the Sumerian takeoff") resulting in both a comparative advantage and a competitive advantage. They had the most developed state structures and were thus able to develop long-distance commercial links, exercise influence over their neighbours, and perhaps engage in military conquest.

Algaze's theory, like other alternative models, has been criticised, particularly because a solid model remains difficult to demonstrate while the Uruk civilization remains poorly known in Lower Mesopotamia aside from the two monumental complexes that have been excavated at Uruk itself. We are therefore poorly placed to evaluate the impact of the development of southern Mesopotamia, since we have almost no archaeological evidence about it. Moreover, the chronology of this period is far from established, which makes it difficult to date the expansion. It has proven difficult to make the levels at different sites correspond closely enough to attribute them to a single period, making the elaboration of relative chronology very complicated. Among the theories that have been advanced to explain the Uruk expansion, the commercial explanation is frequently revived. However, although long-distance trade is undoubtedly a secondary phenomenon for the south Mesopotamian states compared to local production and seems to follow the development of increased social complexity rather than causing it, this does not necessarily prove a process of colonisation. Some other theories propose a form of agrarian colonisation resulting from a shortage of land in Lower Mesopotamia or a migration of refugees after the Uruk region suffered ecological or political upheavals. These explanations are largely advanced to explain the sites of the Syro-Anatolian world, rather than as global theories.

Other explanations avoid political and economic factors in order to focus on the Uruk expansion as a long term cultural phenomenon, using concepts of koine, acculturation, hybridity and cultural emulation to emphasise their differentiation according to the cultural regions and sites in question. P. Butterlin has proposed that the links tying southern Mesopotamia to its neighbours in this period should be seen as a 'world culture' rather than an economic 'world system', in which the Uruk region provided a model to its neighbours, each of which took up more adaptable elements in their own way and retained some local traits essentially unchanged. This is intended to explain the different degrees of influence or acculturation.

In effect, the impact of Uruk is generally distinguished in specific sites and regions, which has led to the development of multiple typologies of material considered to be characteristic of the Uruk culture (especially the pottery and the beveled rim bowls). It has been possible to identify multiple types of site, ranging from colonies that could be actual Urukian sites through to trading posts with an Urukian enclave and sites that are mostly local with a weak or non-existent Urukian influence, as well as others where contacts are more or less strong without supplanting the local culture. The case of Susiana and the Iranian plateau, which is generally studied by different scholars from those who work on Syrian and Anatolian sites, has led to some attempted explanations based on local developments, notably the development of the proto-Elamite culture, which is sometimes seen as a product of the expansion and sometimes as an adversary. The case of the southern Levant and Egypt is different again and helps to highlight the role of local cultures as receivers of the Uruk culture. In the Levant there was no stratified society with embryonic cities and bureaucracy, and therefore no strong elite to act as local intermediaries of Urukian culture and as a result Urukian influence is especially weak. In Egypt, Urukian influence seems to be limited to a few objects which were seen as prestigious or exotic (most notably the knife of Jebel el-Arak), chosen by the elite at a moment when they needed to assert their power in a developing state.

It might be added that an interpretation of the relations of this period as centre/periphery interaction, although often relevant in period, risks prejudicing researchers to see decisions in an asymmetric or diffusionist fashion, and this needs to be nuanced. Thus, it increasingly appears that the regions neighbouring Lower Mesopotamia did not wait for the Urukians in order to begin an advanced process of increasing social complexity or urbanisation, as the example of the large site of Tell Brak in Syria shows, which encourages us to imagine the phenomenon from a more 'symmetrical' angle.

Egypt

Egypt-Mesopotamia relations seem to have developed from the 4th millennium BCE, starting in the Uruk period for Mesopotamia and in the pre-literate Gerzean culture for Prehistoric Egypt (circa 3500-3200 BCE). Influences can be seen in the visual arts of Egypt, in imported products, and also in the possible transfer of writing from Mesopotamia to Egypt, and generated "deep-seated" parallels in the early stages of both cultures.

Society and culture

On the cusp of prehistory and history, the Uruk period can be considered 'revolutionary' and foundational in many ways. Many of the innovations which it produced were turning points in the history of Mesopotamia and indeed of the world. It is in this period that one sees the general appearance of the potter's wheel, writing, the city, and the state. There is new progress in the development of state-societies, such that specialists see fit to label them as 'complex' (in comparison with earlier societies which are said to be 'simple').

Scholarship is therefore interested in this period as a crucial step in the evolution of society—a long and cumulative process whose roots could be seen at the beginning of the Neolithic more than 6000 years earlier and which had picked up steam in the preceding Ubayd period in Mesopotamia. This is especially the case in English-language scholarship, in which the theoretical approaches have been largely inspired by anthropology since the 1970s, and which has studied the Uruk period from the angle of 'complexity' in analysing the appearance of early states, an expanding social hierarchy, intensification of long-distance trade, etc.

In order to discern the key developments which make this period a crucial step in the history of the ancient Near East, research focusses mainly on the centre, Lower Mesopotamia, and on sites in neighbouring regions which are clearly integrated into the civilization which originated there (especially the 'colonies' of the middle Euphrates). The aspects traced here are mostly those of the Late Uruk period, which is the best known and undoubtedly the period in which the most rapid change took place—it is the moment when the characteristic traits of the ancient Mesopotamian civilization were established.

Technology and economy 
The 4th millennium BC saw the appearance of new tools which had a substantial impact on the societies that used them, especially in the economic sphere. Some of them, although known in the preceding period, only came into use on a large scale at this time. The use of these inventions produced economic and social changes in combination with the emergence of political structures and administrative states.

Agriculture and pastoralism 

In the agricultural sphere, several important innovations were made between the end of the Ubayd period and the Uruk period, which have been referred to in total as the 'Second Agricultural Revolution' (the first being the Neolithic Revolution). A first group of developments took place in the field of cereal cultivation, followed by the invention of the ard—a wooden plough pulled by an animal (ass or ox)—towards the end of the 4th millennium BC, which enabled the production of long furrows in the earth. This made the agricultural work in the sowing season much simpler than previously, when this work had to be done by hand with tools like the hoe. The harvest was made easier after the Ubayd period by the widespread adoption of terracotta sickles. Irrigation techniques also seem to have improved in the Uruk period. These different inventions allowed the progressive development of a new agricultural landscape, characteristic of ancient Lower Mesopotamia. It consisted of long rectangular fields suited for being worked in furrows, each bordered by a little irrigation channel. According to M. Liverani, these replaced the earlier basins irrigated laboriously by hand. As for the date palm, we know from archaeological discoveries that these fruits are consumed in Lower Mesopotamia in the 5th millennium BC. The date of its first cultivation by man can't be precisely determined: it is commonly supposed that the culture of this tree knew its development during the Late Uruk period, but the texts are not explicit on this matter. This system which progressively developed over two thousand years enabled higher yields, leaving more surplus than previously for workers, whose rations mainly consisted of barley. The human, material, and technical resources were now available for agriculture based on paid labour, although family-based farming remained the base unit. All of this undoubtedly led to population increase and thus urbanisation and the development of state structures.

The Uruk period also saw important developments in the realm of pastoralism. First of all, it is in this period that the wild onager was finally domesticated as the donkey. It was the first domesticated equid in the region and became the most important beast of burden in the Near East (the dromedary was only domesticated in the 3rd millennium BC, in Arabia). With its high transport capacity (about double that of a human), it enabled the further development of trade over short and long distances. Pastoralism of animals which had already been domesticated (sheep, horses, cattle) also developed further. Previously these animals had been raised mainly as sources of meat, but they now became more important for the products which they provided (wool, fur, hides, milk) and as beasts of burden. This final aspect was especially connected with the cattle, which became essential for work in the fields with the appearance of the ard, and the donkey which assumed a major role in the transportation of goods.

Crafts and construction 
The development of woolworking, which increasingly replaced linen in the production of textiles, had important economic implications. Beyond the expansion of sheep farming, these were notably in the institutional framework, which led to changes in agricultural practice with the introduction of pasturage for these animals in the fields, as convertible husbandry, and in the hilly and mountainous zones around Mesopotamia (following a kind of transhumance). The relative decline in the cultivation of flax for linen freed land for the growth of cereals as well as sesame, which was introduced to Lower Mesopotamia at this time and was a profitable replacement for flax since it provided sesame oil. Subsequently, this resulted in the development of an important textile industry, attested by many cylinder-seal impressions. This too was largely an institutional development, since wool became an essential element in the maintenance rations provided to workers along with barley. The establishment of this 'wool cycle' alongside the 'barley cycle' (the terms used by Mario Liverani) had the same results for the processing and its redistribution, giving the ancient Mesopotamian economy its two key industries and went along with the economic development of large systems. Moreover, wool could be exported easily (unlike perishable food products), which may have meant that the Mesopotamians had something to exchange with their neighbours who had more in the way of primary materials.

Pottery

The production of pottery was revolutionised by the invention of the potter's wheel in the course of the 4th millennium, which was developed in two stages: first a slow wheel and then a rapid one. As a result of this it was no longer necessary to shape ceramics with the hands alone and the shaping process was more rapid. Potters' kilns were also improved. Pottery was simply coated with slip to smooth the surface and decoration became less and less complex until there was basically none. Painted pottery was then secondary and the rare examples of decoration are mainly incisions (lozenge patterns or grid lines). Archaeological sites from this period produce large quantities of pottery, showing that a new level of mass-production had been reached, for a larger population—especially in cities in contact with large administrative systems. They were mainly used for holding various kinds of agricultural production (barley, beer, dates, milk, etc.) and were thus pervasive in everyday life. This period marks the appearance of potters who specialised in the production of large quantities of pottery, which resulted in the emergence of specialised districts within communities. Although the quality was low, the diversity of shapes and sizes became more important than previously, with the diversification of the functions served by pottery. Not all the pottery of this period was produced on the potter's wheel: the most distinctive vessel of the Uruk period, the beveled rim bowls, were hand-moulded.

Metallurgy
Metallurgy also seems to have developed further in this period, but very few objects survive. The preceding Ubayd period marked the beginning of what is known as the chalcolithic or 'copper age', with the beginning of production of copper objects. The metal objects found in the sites of the 4th millennium BC are thus above all made with copper, and some alloys appear towards the end of the period, the most common being that of copper and arsenic (arsenical bronze), the copper-lead alloy being also found, while the tin bronze does not begin to spread until the following millennium (although the Late Uruk Period is supposed to be the beginning of the 'Bronze Age'). The development of metallurgy also implies the development of long-distance trade in metals. Mesopotamia needed to import metal from Iran or Anatolia, which motivated the long-distance trade which we see developing in the 4th millennium BC and explains why Mesopotamian metalworkers preferred techniques which were very economical in their use of raw metal.

Architecture

In architecture, the developments of the Uruk period were also considerable. This is demonstrated by the structures created in the Eanna district of Uruk during the Late Uruk period, which show an explosion of architectural innovations in the course of a series of constructions which were unprecedented in their scale and methods. The builders perfected the use of molded mud-brick as a building material and the use of more solid terracotta bricks became widespread. They also began to waterproof the bricks with bitumen and to use gypsum as mortar. Clay was not the sole building material: some structures were built in stone, notably the limestone quarried about 50 km west of Uruk (where gypsum and sandstone were also found). New types of decoration came into use, like the use of painted pottery cones to make mosaics, which are characteristic of the Eanna in Uruk, semi-engaged columns, and fastening studs. Two standardised forms of molded mud-brick appear in these buildings from Uruk: little square bricks which were easy to handle (known as Riemchen) and the large bricks used to make terraces (Patzen). These were used in large public buildings, especially in Uruk. The creation of smaller bricks enabled the creation of decorative niches and projections which were to be a characteristic feature of Mesopotamian architecture thereafter. The layout of the buildings was also novel, since they did not continue the tripartite plan inherited from the Ubayd period: buildings on the Eanna at this time had labyrinthine plans with elongated halls of pillars within a rectangular building. The architects and artisans who worked on these sites this had the opportunity to display a high level of creativity.

Means of transport 
A debated question in the realm of transport is whether it was in the Uruk period that the wheel was invented. Towards the end of the Uruk period, cylinder seals depict sleds, which had hitherto been the most commonly depicted form of land transport, less and less. They begin to show the first vehicles that appear to be on wheels, but it is not certain that they actually depict wheels themselves. In any case, the wheel spread extremely rapidly and enabled the creation of vehicles that enabled much easier transport of much larger loads. There were certainly chariots in southern Mesopotamia at the beginning of the 3rd millennium BC. Their wheels were solid blocks; spokes were not invented until c. 2000 BC.

The domestication of the donkey was also an advance of considerable importance, because they were more useful than the wheel as a means of transport in mountainous regions and for long-distance travel, before the spoked wheel was invented. The donkey enabled the system of caravans that would dominate trade in the Near East for the following millennia, but this system is not actually attested in the Uruk period.

For transport at the local and regional level in Lower Mesopotamia, boats made from reeds and wood were crucial, on account of the importance of the rivers for connecting places and because they were capable of carrying much larger loads than land transport.

City-states
The 4th millennium BC saw a new stage in the political development of Near Eastern society after the Neolithic: political power grew stronger, more organised, more centralised, and more visible in the use of space and in art, culminating in the development of a true state by the end of the period. This development came with other major changes: the appearance of the first cities and of administrative systems capable of organising diverse activities. The causes and means by which these developments occurred and their relationship to one another are the subject of extensive debate.

The first states and their institutions 

The Uruk period provides the earliest signs of the existence of states in the Near East. The monumental architecture is more imposing than that of the preceding period; 'Temple D' of Eanna covers around 4600 m2—a substantial increase compared to the largest known temple of the Ubayd period, level VI of Eridu, which had an area of only 280 m2—and the Eanna complex's other buildings cover a further 1000 m2, while the Ubayd temple of Eridu was a stand-alone structure. The change in size reflects a step-change in the ability of central authorities to mobilise human and material resources. Tombs also show a growing differentiation of wealth and thus an increasingly powerful elite, who sought to distinguish themselves from the rest of the population by obtaining prestige goods, through trade if possible and by employing increasingly specialised artisans. The idea that the Uruk period saw the appearance of a true state, simultaneously with the appearance of the first cities (following Gordon Childe), is generally accepted in scholarship but has been criticised by some scholars, notably J.D. Forest who prefers to see the Empire of Akkad in the 24th century BC as the first true state and considers Late Uruk to have known only "city-states" (which are not complete states in his view). Regardless, the institution of state-like political structures is concomitant with several other phenomena of the Uruk period.

What kind of political organisation existed in the Uruk period is debated. No evidence supports the idea that this period saw the development of a kind of 'proto-empire' centred on Uruk, as has been proposed by Algaze and others. It is probably best to understand an organisation in 'city-states' like those that existed in the 3rd millennium BC. This seems to be corroborated by the existence of 'civic seals' in the Jemdet Nasr period, which bear symbols of the Sumerian cities of Uruk, Ur, Larsa, etc. The fact that these symbols appeared together might indicate a kind of league or confederation uniting the cities of southern Mesopotamia, perhaps for religious purposes, perhaps under the authority of one of them (Uruk?).

It is clear that there were major changes in the political organisation of society in this period. The nature of the powerholders is not easy to determine because they cannot be identified in the written sources and the archaeological evidence is not very informative: no palaces or other buildings for the exercise of power have been identified for sure and no monumental tomb for a ruler has been found either. Images on steles and cylinder-seals are a little more evocative. An important figure who clearly holds some kind of authority has long been noted: a bearded man with a headband who is usually depicted wearing a bell-shaped skirt or as ritually naked. He is often represented as a warrior fighting human enemies or wild animals, e.g. in the 'Stele of the Hunt' found at Uruk, in which he defeats lions with his bow. He is also found in victory scenes accompanied by prisoners or structures. He also is shown leading cult activities, as on a vase from Uruk of the Jemdet Nasr period which shows him leading a procession towards a goddess, who is almost certainly Inanna. In other cases, he is shown feeding animals, which suggests the idea of the king as a shepherd, who gathers his people together, protects them and looks after their needs, ensuring the prosperity of the kingdom. These motifs match the functions of the subsequent Sumerian kings: war-leader, chief priest, and builder. Scholars have proposed that this figure should be called the 'Priest-King'. This ruler may be the person designated in Uruk III tablets by the title of en. He could represent a power of a monarchic type, like that would subsequently exist in Mesopotamia.

Researchers who analyse the appearance of the state as being characterised by greater central control and stronger social hierarchy, are interested in the role of the elites who sought to reinforce and organise their power over a network of people and institutions and to augment their prestige. This development is also connected with the changes in iconography and with the emergence of an ideology of royalty intended to support the construction of a new kind of political entity. The elites played a role as religious intermediaries between the divine world and the human world, notably in sacrificial ritual and in festivals which they organised and which assured their symbolic function as the foundation of social order. This reconstruction is apparent from the friezes on the great alabaster vase of Uruk and in many administrative texts which mention the transport of goods to be used in rituals. In fact, according to the Mesopotamian ideology known in the following period, human beings had been created by the gods in order to serve them and the goodwill of the latter was necessary to insure the prosperity of society.

With respect to this development of a more centralised control of resources, the tablets of Late Uruk reveal the existence of institutions that played an important role in society and economy and undoubtedly in contemporary politics. Whether these institutions were temples or palaces is debated. In any case, both institutions were dominant in the later periods of Lower Mesopotamia's history. Only two names relating to these institutions and their personnel have been deciphered: a large authority indicated by the sign NUN, at Uruk, which possessed an administrator in chief, a messenger, some workers, etc.; and another authority indicated by the signs AB NI+RU, at Jemdet Nasr, which had a high priest (SANGA), administrators, priests, etc. Their scribes produced administrative documents relating to the management of land, the distribution of rations (barley, wool, oil, beer, etc.) for workers, which include slaves, and listing of the heads of livestock. These institutions could control the production of prestige goods, redistribution, long-distance trade, and the management of public works. They were able to support increasingly specialised workers. The largest institutions contained multiple 'departments' devoted to a single activity (cultivation of fields, herds, etc.).

But there is no proof that these institutions played a role in the supervision of the majority of the population in the process of centralising production. The economy rested on a group of domains (or 'houses' / 'households', É in Sumerian) of different sizes, from large institutions to modest family groups, that can be classified in modern terms as 'public' or 'private' and which were in constant interaction with one another. Some archives were probably produced in a private context in residences of Susa, Habuba Kabira, and Jebel Aruda. But these documents represent relatively rudimentary accounting, indicating a smaller scale of economic activity. One study carried out at Abu Salabikh in lower Mesopotamia indicated that the production was distributed between different households of different sizes, wealth, and power, with the large institutions at the top.

Research into the causes of the emergence of these political structures has not produced any theory which is widely accepted. Research into explanations is heavily influenced by evolutionist frameworks and is in fact more interested in the period before the appearance of the state, which was the product of a long process and preceded by the appearance of 'chieftainships.' This process was not a linear progression but was marked by phases of growth and decline (like the 'collapse' of archaeological cultures). Its roots lie in the societies of the Neolithic period, and the process is characterised by the increase of social inequality over the long term, visible in particular in the creation of monumental architecture and funerary materials by groups of the elite, which reinforced itself as a collective and managed to exercise its power in a firmer and firmer manner. Among the main causes proposed by proponents of the functionalist model of the state are a collective response to practical problems (particularly following serious crises or a deadlocks), like the need to better manage the demographic growth of a community or to provide it with resources through agricultural production or trade, alternatively others suggest that it was driven by the need to soothe or direct conflicts arising from the process of securing those resources. Other explanatory models put more stress on the personal interest of individuals in their quest for power and prestige. It is likely that several of these explanations are relevant.

Urbanisation 

The Uruk period saw some settlements achieve a new importance and population density, as well as the development of monumental civic architecture. They reached a level where they can properly be called cities. This was accompanied by a number of social changes resulting in what can fairly be called an 'urban' society as distinct from the 'rural' society which provided food for the growing portion of the population that did not feed itself, although the relationship between the two groups and the views of the people of the time about this distinction remain difficult to discern. This phenomenon was characterised by Gordon Childe at the beginning of the 1950s as an 'urban revolution', linked to the 'Neolithic revolution' and inseparable from the appearance of the first states. This model, which is based on material evidence, has been heavily debated ever since. The causes of the appearance of cities have been discussed a great deal. Some scholars explain the development of the first cities by their role as ceremonial religious centres, others by their role as hubs for long-distance trade, but the most widespread theory is that developed largely by Robert McCormick Adams which considers the appearance of cities to be a result of the appearance of the state and its institutions, which attracted wealth and people to central settlements, and encouraged residents to become increasingly specialised. This theory thus leads the problem of the origin of cities back to the problem of origin of the state and of inequality.

In the Late Uruk period, the urban site of Uruk far exceeded all others. Its surface area, the scale of its monuments and the importance of the administrative tools unearthed there indicate that it was a key centre of power. It is often therefore referred to as the 'first city', but it was the outcome of a process that began many centuries earlier and is largely attested outside Lower Mesopotamia (aside from the monumental aspect of Eridu). The emergence of important proto-urban centres began at the beginning of the 4th millennium BC in southwest Iran (Chogha Mish, Susa), and especially in the Jazirah (Tell Brak, Hamoukar, Tell al-Hawa, Grai Resh). Excavations in the latter region tend to contradict the idea that urbanisation began in Mesopotamia and then spread to neighbouring regions; the appearance of an urban centre at Tell Brak appears to have resulted from a local process with the progressive aggregation of village communities that had previously lived separately, and without the influence of any strong central power (unlike what seems to have been the case at Uruk). Early urbanisation should therefore be thought of as a phenomenon which took place simultaneously in several regions of the Near East in the 4th millennium BC, though further research and excavation is still required in order to make this process clearer to us.

Examples of urbanism in this period are still rare, and in Lower Mesopotamia, the only residential area which has been excavated is at Abu Salabikh, a settlement of limited size. It is necessary to turn to Syria and the neighbouring sites of Habuba Kabira and Jebel Aruda for an example of urbanism that is relatively well-known. Habuba Kabira consisted of 22 hectares, surrounded by a wall and organised around some important buildings, major streets and narrow alleys, and a group of residences of similar shape organised around a courtyard. It was clearly a planned city created ex nihilo and not an agglomeration that developed passively from village to city. The planners of this period were thus capable of creating a complete urban plan and thus had an idea of what a city was, including its internal organisation and principal monuments. Urbanisation is not found everywhere in the sphere of influence of the Uruk culture; at its extreme northern edge, the site of Arslantepe had a palace of notable size but it was not surrounded by any kind of urban area.

The study of houses at the sites of Habuba Kabira and Jebel Aruda has revealed the social evolution which accompanied the appearance of urban society. The former site, which is the better known, has houses of different sizes, which cover an average area of 400 m2, while the largest have a footprint of more than 1000 m2. The 'temples' of the monumental group of Tell Qanas may have been residences for the leaders of the city. These are thus very hierarchical habitats, indicating the social differentiation that existed in the urban centres of the Late Uruk period (much more than in the preceding period). Another trait of the nascent urban society is revealed by the organisation of domestic space. The houses seem to fold in on themselves, with a new floor plan developed from the tripartite plan current in the Ubayd period, but augmented by a reception area and by a central space (perhaps open to the sky), around which the other rooms were arranged. These houses thus had a private space separated from a public space where guests could be received. In an urban society with a community so much larger than village societies, the relations with people outside the household became more distant, leading to this separation of the house. Thus the old rural house was adapted to the realities of urban society. This model of a house with a central space remained very widespread in the cities of Mesopotamia in the following periods, although it must be kept in mind that the floor plans of residences were very diverse and depended on the development of urbanism in different sites.

Development of "symbolic technology", accounting and bureaucracy 

The Uruk period, particularly in its late phase, is characterized by the explosion of "symbolic technology": signs, images, symbolic designs and abstract numbers are used in order to manage efficiently a more complex human society. The appearance of institutions and households with some important economic functions was accompanied by the development of administrative tools and then accounting tools. This was a veritable 'managerial revolution'. A  developed in the Late Uruk period and contributed to the development of a bureaucracy, but only in the context of the large institutions. Many texts seem to indicate the existence of training in the production of managerial texts for apprentice scribes, who could also use lexical lists to learn writing. This, notably, allowed them to administer trading posts with precision, noting down the arrival and departure of products—sometimes presented as purchase and sale—in order to maintain an exact count of the products in stock in the storerooms which the scribe had responsibility for. These storage spaces were closed and marked with the seal of the administrator in charge. The scribal class were involved in understanding and managing the state, in the exploitation and production capacity of the fields, troops, and artisans, for many years, which involved the production of inventories, and led to the construction of true archives of the activities of an institution or one of its subdivisions. This was possible due to the progressive development of more management tools, especially true writing.

Seals were used to secure merchandise that had been stocked or exchanged, to secure storage areas, or to identify an administrator or merchant. They are attested from the middle of the 7th millennium BC. With the development of institutions and long-distance trade, their use became widespread. In the course of the Uruk period, cylinder seals (cylinders engraved with a motif which could be rolled over clay in order to impress a symbol in it) were invented and replaced the simple seals. They were used to seal clay envelopes and tablets, and to authenticate objects and goods, because they functioned like a signature for the person who applied the seal or for the institution which they represented. These cylinder seals would remain a characteristic element of Near Eastern civilization for several millennia. The reasons for their success lay in the possibilities that they offered of an image and thus a message with more detail, with a narrative structure, and perhaps an element of magic.

The Uruk period also saw the development of what seem to be accounting tools: tokens and clay envelopes containing tokens. These are clay balls on which a cylinder seal has been rolled, which contain tokens (also referred to as calculi). The latter come in various forms: balls, cones, rods, discs, etc. Each of these models has been identified as representing a certain numerical value, or a specific type of merchandise. They made it possible to store information for the management of institutions (arrival and departure of goods) or commercial operations, and to send that information to other places. These calculi are perhaps the same type as the tokens found on sites in the Near East for the next few thousand years, whose function remains uncertain. It is thought that notches would be placed on the surface of the clay balls containing the calculi, leading to the creation of numerical tablets which served as an aide-mémoire before the development of true writing (on which, see below).

The development of writing, whether or not it derived from accounting practices, represented a new management tool which made it possible to note information more precisely and for a longer-term. The development of these administrative practices necessitated the development of a system of measurement which varied depending on what they were to measure (animals, workers, wool, grain, tools, pottery, surfaces, etc.). They are very diverse: some use a sexagesimal system (base 60), which would become the universal system in subsequent periods, but others employ a decimal system (base 10) or even a mixed system called 'bisexagesimal', all of which makes it more difficult to understand the texts. The system for counting time was also developed by the scribes of institutions in the Late Uruk period.

Intellectual and symbolic life 
The developments that society experienced in the Uruk period had an impact in the mental and symbolic realm which manifested as a number of different phenomena. First, although the appearance of writing was undoubtedly connected to the managerial needs of the first state, it led to profound intellectual changes. Art also reflected a society more heavily shaped by political power, and religious cults grew more impressive and spectacular than previously. The development of religious thought in this period remains very poorly understood.

Writing 

Writing appeared very early in the Middle Uruk period, and then developed further in the Late Uruk and Jemdet Nasr periods. The first clay tablets inscribed with a reed stylus are found in Uruk IV (nearly 2000 tablets were found in the Eanna quarter) and some are found also in Susa II, consisting solely of numeric signs. For the Jemdet Nasr period, there is more evidence from more sites: the majority come from Uruk III (around 3000 tablets), but also Jemdet Nasr, Tell Uqair, Umma, Khafadje, Tell Asmar, Nineveh, Tell Brak, Habuba Kabira, etc. as well as tablets with proto-Elamite writing in Iran (especially Susa), the second writing system to be developed in the Near East.

The texts of this period are mostly of an administrative type and are found principally in contexts that seem to be public (palaces or temples), rather than private. But the texts of Uruk, which constitute the majority of the total corpus for this period, were discovered in a trash heap rather than in the context in which they were produced and used; this makes it difficult to identify them. Their interpretation is equally problematic, on account of their archaic character. The writing is not yet cuneiform, but is linear. These texts were misunderstood by their first publisher in the 1930s, Adam Falkenstein, and it was only through the work of the German researchers Hans Nissen, Peter Damerow and Robert Englund over the following 20 years that substantial progress was made. Alongside the administrative texts, were discovered from the beginning of writing, some literary texts, the lexical lists, lexicographic works of a scholarly type, which compile signs according to different themes (lists of crafts, metals, pots, cereals, toponyms, etc.) and are characteristic of Mesopotamian civilization. A remarkable example is a List of Professions (ancestor of the series Lú.A, which is known from the 3rd millennium BC), in which various different types of craftsmen are listed (potters, weavers, carpenters, etc.), indicating the numerous types of specialist workers in late Uruk.

The causes and course of the origins of writing are disputed. The dominant theory has them derive from more ancient accounting practices, notably those of the calculi mentioned above. In the model developed by Denise Schmandt-Besserat, the tokens were first reported on the clay envelopes, then on clay tablets and this led to the creation of the first written signs, which were pictograms, drawings which represent a physical object (logograms, one sign = one word). But this is very contested because there is no obvious correspondence between the tokens and the pictograms that replaced them. In general, a first development (occurring around 3300–3100 BC) is however retained as being based on accounting and management practices, and has been explored in more detailed by H. Nissen and R. Englund. This writing system is pictographic, made up of linear signs incised in clay tablets using a reed pen (both reeds and clay being very easily accessible in southern Mesopotamia).

The majority of the texts of the Uruk period are concerned with management and accounting, so it is logical to imagine that writing was developed in response to the needs of the state institutions which engaged in more and more management over time, since it offered the possibility of recording more complex operations and of creating an archive. From this point of view, the pre-writing system which developed around 3400–3200 BC functioned as an aide-mémoire and was not capable of recording complete phrases because it only had symbols for real objects, especially goods and people, with a vast number of numerical signs for the multiple different metrological systems, and only a few actions (Englund calls this the stage of the 'numerical tablets' and of the 'numero-ideographic tablets'). The signs then began to take on a larger number of values, making it possible to record administrative operations more precisely (approximately 3200–2900 BC, Englund's Proto-Cuneiform phase). In this period or even later (at latest around 2800–2700 BC), another type of meaning was recorded by means of the rebus principle: an association of pictograms could indicate actions (for example head + water = drink), while homophony could be used to represent ideas ('arrow' and 'life' were pronounced the same way in Sumerian, so the sign for 'arrow' could be used to indicate 'life', which would otherwise be difficult to represent pictorially). Thus, some ideograms appeared. Following the same principle, phonetic signs were created (phonograms, one sign = one sound). For example, 'arrow' was pronounced as TI in Sumerian, so the sign for 'arrow' could be used to indicate the sound [ti]). At the beginning of the 3rd millennium BC, the fundamental principles of Mesopotamian writing—the association of logograms and phonograms—had been put in place. Writing was then able to record grammatical elements of the language and thus to record complete phrases, a possibility which was not properly exploited until some centuries later.

A more recent theory, defended by Jean-Jacques Glassner, argues that from the beginning writing was more than just a managerial tool; it was also a method for recording concepts and language (i.e. Sumerian), because from its invention the signs did not only represent real objects (pictograms) but also ideas (ideograms), along with their associated sounds (phonograms). This theory presents writing as a radical conceptual change, resulting in a change in the way the world was perceived. From the beginning of writing, scribes wrote lexical lists on the edges of administrative documents. These were proper scholarly works, enabling them to explore the possibilities of the writing system in classifying signs according to their 'families', inventing new signs, and developing the writing system, but more generally they were also producing a classification of the things that constituted the world which they inhabited, improving their understanding of it. According to Glassner, this indicates that the invention of writing cannot be entirely linked with material considerations. The invention of such a system required reflection on the image and the different senses that a sign could bear, notably for representing the abstract.

Art 

The Uruk period saw a notable renewal, which accompanied substantial changes in the symbolic sphere. This is visible primarily in the artistic media: the forms of pottery became more rudimentary, after the development of the potter's wheel, which allowed mass-production without a focus on decorative elements. Painted pottery is less common than in previous periods, with no decoration or just incisions or pellets. The greater complexity of the society and the development of more powerful elites who wanted to express their power in more diverse ways offered new opportunities to artists who could express themselves in other media. Sculpture took on exceptional importance, whether it was carved in the round, or as bas-relief on steles and especially on cylinder seals which first appeared in the Middle Uruk period. These have been the object of numerous studies because they are very good evidence for the mental universe of the people of this period and a means for diffusing symbolic messages, as a result of the possibility of representing more complex scenes than on stamp seals, since they could be rolled out indefinitely, creating a narration with more dynamism than stamps.

The artistic canons of the period were clearly more realistic than the preceding periods. The human being is at the centre of this art. This is notably the case with the cylinder seals and prints of cylinder seals found at Susa (level II), which are the most realistic of the period: they represent the central figure of society as the monarch, but also some ordinary men engaged in everyday life, agricultural and artisanal work (pottery, weaving). This realism indicates a true shift, which might be called 'humanist', because it marks a turning point in Mesopotamian art and more generally a change in the mental universe which placed man or at least the human form in a more prominent position than ever before. It is perhaps at the end of the Uruk period that the first signs of anthropomorphism of divinities that became the norm in subsequent periods emerge. The Uruk vase undoubtedly represents the goddess Inanna in human form. Additionally, real and fantastic animals were always present on seals, often as the principle subject of the scene. A very widespread motif is that of the 'cycle' representing a series of animals in continuous line, exploiting the new possibilities offered by the cylinder seal.

Sculpture followed the style and themes of seals. Small statues were made representing gods or  'priest-kings.' The artists of Uruk created many remarkable works, represented above all by the works in the Sammelfund (hoard) of level III of Eanna (Jemdet Nasr period). Some bas-reliefs are found on steles like the 'Hunt stele' or the great alabaster vase representing a scene of a man giving an offering to a goddess, undoubtedly Inanna. These works also foreground an authority figure who carries out military exploits and manages religious cults. They are also characterised by their level of realism in the depiction of the features of individuals. A final remarkable work of the artists of Uruk III is the Mask of Warka, a sculpted female head with realistic proportions, which was discovered in a damaged state, but was probably originally part of a complete body.

Religion 

The religious universe of the Late Uruk period is very difficult to understand. As already stated, the cult places are very difficult to identify archaeologically, in particular in the area of the Eanna in Uruk. But in many cases, the cult foundations of buildings seems very probable, based on the similarity with buildings in later periods which were certainly sanctuaries: the white temple of Uruk, the temples of Eridu, of Tell Uqair. Some religious installations like altars and basins have been found here. It appears that deities were worshiped in temples. They call to mind several temples, designated by the sign for 'house' (É), because these buildings were seen as the earthly residence of the god. Religious personnel ('priests') appear in some texts like lists of jobs.

The best-attested figure in the tablets is the goddess designated by the sign MÙŠ, Inanna (later Ishtar), the great goddess of Uruk whose sanctuary was located in the Eanna. The other great deity of Uruk, Anu (the Sky), seems to appear in some texts, but it is not certain because the sign that indicates him (a star) can also indicate divinities in a general sense (DINGIR). These gods received various offerings in everyday cult, but also in festival ceremonies like those in subsequent periods. The great vase of Uruk also seems to represent a procession bringing offerings to the goddess Inanna, whose symbol appears on the frieze. The religious beliefs of the 4th millennium BC have been the object of debate: Thorkild Jacobsen saw a religion focused on gods linked to the cycle of nature and fertility, but this remains very speculative.

Other analyses have revealed the existence of a collective cult in the Sumerian cities of the Jemdet Nasr period, focused on the cult of the goddess Inanna and her sanctuary at Uruk, who thus had a preeminent position. The gods seem to be associated with specific cities - as was characteristic of Mesopotamia from the 3rd millennium BC—rather than being linked to specific forces of nature. The presence of a cult surrounded by institutions and bureaucracy, relying on their capacity to produce or collect wealth and apparently controlled by a royal figure indicates that the religion which is seen in the sources was an official religion, in which the sacrificial act was seen as preserving good relations between men and gods, so that the latter would ensure the prosperity of the former.

End of the Uruk period

A few commentators have associated the end of the Uruk period with the climate changes linked to the Piora Oscillation, an abrupt cold and wet period in the climate history of the Holocene Epoch. Another explanation given is the arrival of the East Semitic tribes represented by the Kish civilization.

See also

History of Mesopotamia
History of Sumer
Jawa in Jordan, proto-urban settlement with a masonry gravity dam initially built between 3500 and 3400 BCE
Pella in Jordan, with a walled city dated to 3400 BCE

References

Bibliography

General works on prehistoric and proto-historic Mesopotamia

Studies on the Uruk period 

 
 
 
 
 
 

Archaeological cultures of the Near East
4th millennium BC
1930s neologisms
Chalcolithic cultures of Asia
Bronze Age cultures of Asia
Sumer
Archaeology of Iraq
Archaeology of Kuwait
Uruk
Archaeological cultures in Iraq